Dock of the Bay was a radical New Left underground newspaper published weekly in San Francisco starting July 29, 1969. It was a member of the Underground Press Syndicate and the Liberation News Service. At least 17 issues were printed on a weekly basis from June 29, 1969, to November 25, 1969, when further publication was curtailed. Founded by young radicals and SDS members associated with the New Left activist paper Movement, staffers included Steve Diamond of the Liberation News Service. Controversy with other participants in the underground press movement in the Bay Area developed when some of the Dock of the Bay staff were involved in a side project to launch a separate paper to be called the San Francisco Sex Review with the idea that profits from sex ads could be used to subsidize Dock of the Bay and other New Left projects in San Francisco. This project was aborted after a clash with feminists, and Dock of the Bay ceased publication shortly afterward.

See also
 List of underground newspapers of the 1960s counterculture

Notes

Alternative weekly newspapers published in the United States
Publications established in 1969
Publications disestablished in 1969
1969 establishments in California
1969 disestablishments in California
Counterculture of the 1960s